The Second Sharif provincial cabinet was formed by Shehbaz Sharif in 2008 to begin a new government following the 2008 Pakistani general election.

Cabinet

Ministers
 Malik Nadeem Kamran
 Ehsan ud Din Qureshi
 Malik Muhammad Iqbal Channar
 Rana Sanaullah Khan
 Mian Mujtaba Shuja ur Rehman
 Dost Muhammad Khosa
 Kamran Michael
 Raja Riaz Ahmad Khan
 Tanveer Ashraf Kaira
 Ehsan ud Din Qureshi

References

2008 establishments in Pakistan
Shehbaz Sharif
Cabinets established in 2008
2000s in Pakistan
2000s in politics
Punjab, Pakistan ministries